Heligoland is the fifth studio album by English electronic music duo Massive Attack, released on 8 February 2010 by Virgin Records. Named after a German archipelago, it was their first studio album in seven years, following 100th Window (2003). It has been certified Gold by the British Phonographic Industry (BPI).

Personnel 
The record primarily features vocals from Horace Andy, as well as a number of guest vocalists: Tunde Adebimpe of TV on the Radio, Damon Albarn of Blur and Gorillaz, Hope Sandoval of Hope Sandoval and the Warm Inventions and Mazzy Star, Guy Garvey of Elbow and Martina Topley-Bird. Further contributions include guitar by Adrian Utley of Portishead (on "Saturday Come Slow"), keys from Portishead collaborator John Baggott (most notably on "Atlas Air"), keys and synth bass from Damon Albarn ("Splitting the Atom" and "Flat of the Blade" respectively), guitar (various tracks) and bass ("Girl I Love You") by Neil Davidge, bass by Billy Fuller of Beak (various tracks) and drumming from both the late Jerry Fuchs and regular Massive Attack session and touring drummer Damon Reece.

Dan Brown and Stew Jackson (Robot Club) co-wrote "Paradise Circus", played guitar on and co-wrote "Saturday Come Slow", and part-programmed and engineered those tracks. Tim Goldsworthy contributed additional production (specific tracks unstated). Most tracks were mixed by Mark "Spike" Stent and mastered by Tim Young at Metropolis Studios, as with previous records. Unlike previous records, there are no personal acknowledgements on the inlay. Most tracks were co-produced by Neil Davidge and Robert Del Naja; Grant Marshall only contributed production to "Splitting The Atom", "Paradise Circus" and "Saturday Come Slow", but co-wrote every track. The album is dedicated to the memory of Blue Lines co-producer, Jonny Dollar.

Background 
The album's release was preceded by the release of the Splitting the Atom EP on 4 October 2009. During its development, the album was often referred to in the media as "LP5" (a reference to this being their fifth studio album) or "Weather Underground" (Robert Del Naja's early working title).

The artwork, as with every Massive Attack album since Protection, is a collaboration between Tom Hingston and Del Naja, this time based on Del Naja's paintings. For an advertisement campaign on the London Underground, local traffic authority Transport for London insisted the cover image featured on advertising posters be altered so as not to resemble "street art", obliging the artists to remove drips and fuzz from the original image; this was intended to conform with their policy to not encourage graffiti.

Many other guest vocalists recorded sessions in the time after 100th Window but did not end up being featured on the album. These include: Stephanie Dosen, Yolanda Quartey of Phantom Limb – effectively Robot Club's band) and Jhelisa (Anderson, who had previously recorded in 2002 in the studio for material that was not included on 100th Window); and, mostly before the release of CollectedMike Patton, Aku and Akwetey Orraca-Tetteh and Devang Shah of Dragons of Zynth, Elizabeth Fraser, Terry Callier, Fredo Viola, Debbie Clare, Beth Orton and Dot Allison. Mos Def and Leslie Feist were named as artists scheduled for recording sessions back in 2004. Backing tracks from Grant Marshall's side of Massive Attack's writing (mainly facilitated by and done with Robot Club) are known to have been sent to Alice Russell, and prepared for Sharon Jones, Patti Smith and David Bowie during the era but collaboration did not come to fruition, nor did talks with Tom Waits or Tricky, in terms of featuring as guest vocalists on the record. Post-punks Mark Stewart and Keith Levene were pictured inside Del Naja's 100 Suns studio in 2009, but played no part on the album.

Del Naja said of the musical style of Heligoland, "I think it's got definitely a more organic feel. [...] 100th Window was very much about this amalgamation of everything joining, and eventually the process was so extreme that you couldn't tell if there was a string part if it was electronic or natural. [There were] lots of organic parts that ended up sounding very electronic. It became a whole world of different processes, and we wanted to do something a bit different because we've had that experience so we wanted to do something else."The track "Girl I Love You", one of multiple tracks featuring Horace Andy, is a drastically reworked version of a song originally written by Andy during his solo career.

Promotion 
Eight low-budget films were officially released online in promotion of Heligoland:

 "Splitting the Atom" (Promo 1), directed by Baillie Walsh (2009).
 "Paradise Circus", directed by Toby Dye (2009) features clips from an old pornographic film, interspersed with an interview with the film's now-aged female star Georgina Spelvin, who describes each stage of a film-oriented sex act and emphasises the added erotic excitement of the camera.
 "Splitting the Atom" (Promo 2), directed by Edouard Salier (2009). 
 "Flat of the Blade", directed by Ewan Spencer (2009)
 "Saturday Come Slow", directed by Adam Broomberg and Oliver Chanarin (2010), features a former Guantanamo Bay detainee at a laboratory in Cambridge, where he and a professor work in tandem to discuss the use of loud sounds as a means of torture.
 "Psyche", directed by John Downer (2010)
 "Atlas Air", directed by Eduard Salier, was downloadable with the digital Version of the Atlas Air EP. The video is in fact a prequel to Salier's version of "Splitting The Atom"
 "Pray for Rain", directed by Jake Scott (2011)

Furthermore, a "United Snakes" video by UnitedVisualArtists, along with a previous alternate promo for "Psyche" directed by Dougal Wilson were also released.

"Paradise Circus" was licensed as the theme tune for the BBC drama series Luther. "Paradise Circus" can also be heard in Gossip Girl, "Misfits" (S2, Ep4), Revenge (S2, Ep6) and "9 Crimes", the fourth episode of the third season of True Blood, as well as in the 2011 advert "Dominoes" for Citroën C5.
A remixed version of "Paradise Circus" by Gui Boratto, can also be heard on Lincoln MKX commercials featuring Mad Men's John Slattery.

Release 

The deluxe edition of Heligoland, available digitally and as a deluxe vinyl edition release, features three additional remixes as well as the "False Flags" B-side, "United Snakes". Heligoland Remixed is a largely identical release, with the only difference being the replacement of "United Snakes" with an additional remix; this release was uploaded for listening on the duo's Facebook page. The standard edition is also available with a number of differently coloured covers.

Burial remix album 
In late 2009, Marshall suggested in an interview with Clash that the entirety of Heligoland may be remixed by Burial for release as a companion album, though various comments made afterwards suggest that this had been little more than an idea, with no actual work done on these remixes.

In May 2010, Del Naja told Q magazine: "It's happening, but we can't talk about it. [Burial]'s very private and paranoid about it."

"Four Walls"/"Paradise Circus", a single containing Burial's remix of "Paradise Circus", along with a remix of a previously unreleased Massive Attack track, "Four Walls" was released in 2011.

Atlas Air EP 
In interviews, Massive Attack had stated their intention to release an EP of leftover Heligoland tracks in May or June 2010. Songs said to be contained on this EP included "Invade Me" and "Red Light", both featuring Martina Topley-Bird.

Subsequently, Massive Attack announced plans for the release of the Atlas Air EP, both digitally and as a limited edition of 1,000 units on vinyl record, on 1 November 2010, in aid of charity organization Warchild. The EP would feature an edit of the titular song; a Tim Goldsworthy remix; a Guy Garvey-penned and previously unfinished Heligoland track, "Redlight", featuring Guy Garvey on vocals; and its respective remix by Warp artist, Clark.

Plans for the release were later changed: The release was moved back to 22 November 2010; The original version of "Redlight" was removed and replaced by the Jneiro Jarel remix of "Atlas Air", meaning that the EP would feature no previously unreleased work by the band. Additionally, vocals on the remix of "Redlight" were replaced with an uncredited female vocalist instead of those of its songwriter, Guy Garvey.

Track listing

Personnel 
Credits adapted from the liner notes of Heligoland.

Massive Attack 
 Robert Del Naja – vocals, keyboards, programming
 Grant Marshall – vocals

Additional musicians 

 Horace Andy – vocals
 Tunde Adebimpe – vocals
 Martina Topley-Bird – vocals
 Guy Garvey – vocals
 Hope Sandoval – vocals
 Damon Albarn – vocals, bass, keyboards
 Damon Reece – drums
 Jerry Fuchs – drums
 Billy Fuller – bass
 Neil Davidge – bass, keyboards, guitar, programming
 John Baggott – keyboards
 Tim Goldsworthy – keyboards, programming
 Dan Austin – keyboards, programming
 Euan Dickinson – keyboards, programming
 Adrian Utley – guitar
 Stew Jackson – guitar, programming
 Dan Brown – guitar, programming
 Dave Sitek – guitar
 Harry Brown – brass
 Noel Langley – brass
 Chris Storr – brass
 Andy Grappy – brass
 Stuart Gordon – string arrangements

Technical 

 Robert Del Naja – production
 Neil Davidge – production ; mixing 
 Grant Marshall – production 
 Tim Goldsworthy – additional production
 Mark "Spike" Stent – mixing 
 Matty Green – mixing assistance 
 Euan Dickinson – mixing assistance ; engineering 
 Eric Broucek – engineering
 Lee Shephard – engineering
 Leo Sidran – engineering
 Jason Cox – engineering
 Graham Archer – engineering
 Robot Club – engineering
 Tim Young – mastering at Metropolis Mastering (London)

Artwork 
 Robert Del Naja – art, design, art direction
 Tom Hingston Studio – design, art direction

Charts

Weekly charts

Year-end charts

Certifications

References 

2010 albums
Albums produced by Neil Davidge
Albums recorded at Studio 13
Alternative dance albums
Massive Attack albums
Virgin Records albums